Sacramento is a census-designated place  in Otero County, New Mexico, United States. Its population was 58 as of the 2010 census. Sacramento has a post office with ZIP code 88347. New Mexico State Road 521 passes through the community.

Demographics

Economy
The last gas station in Sacramento closed in the 1980s.

Education
It is in Cloudcroft Municipal Schools.

References

Census-designated places in New Mexico
Census-designated places in Otero County, New Mexico